The Trebnitz is a river of Saxony, Germany. It is a right tributary of the Müglitz, which it joins near Glashütte.

See also
List of rivers of Saxony

Rivers of Saxony
Rivers of the Ore Mountains
Rivers of Germany